William Johnston Tupper  (June 29, 1862 – December 17, 1947) was a politician and office holder in Manitoba, Canada. He served as the province's 12th Lieutenant Governor from 1934 to 1940.

Tupper was born in Halifax, Nova Scotia, the son of Charles Tupper (who later served as Premier of Nova Scotia from 1863 to 1867, and Prime Minister of Canada in 1896) and Frances Amélia Morse. He was named in honour of his father's mentor James William Johnston.  He was educated at Upper Canada College and Harvard Law School but returned to Nova Scotia to practice law, being called to the bar in 1885.  Later in the same year, Tupper enlisted as a private in the Canadian army to assist in putting down the North-West Rebellion, and remained in Manitoba afterwards.  He was called to the Manitoba Bar in 1886, and worked in a Winnipeg law firm with Hugh John Macdonald, son of Prime Minister John A. Macdonald. In 1887, he married Margaret, the daughter of James McDonald. He was named a King's Counsel in 1912. Tupper also served as president of the Army and Navy Veterans in Canada.

Tupper entered political life in the 1914 provincial election, running as a Conservative in the rural provincial riding of Morden and Rhineland.  He lost to incumbent Liberal Valentine Winkler, 1,073 votes to 971.  Tupper ran against Winkler again in the 1915 election, and lost again by an increased margin amid a disastrous provincial defeat for his party.

In the 1920 election, Tupper was one of two Conservatives elected to the provincial legislature for Winnipeg, which elected ten members by a single transferable ballot.  He finished second on his party's list, behind John Thomas Haig.  Tupper was one of only eight Conservative MLAs in the legislature, and there is no indication that he played a major role in parliament.  He ran for re-election in the 1922 campaign, but finished 21st overall on first-preference votes and was eliminated on the 24th count.

In 1931, Tupper was elected president of the Law Society of Manitoba, holding the position for three years.

Tupper was sworn in as lieutenant governor on December 1, 1934, and served until November 1, 1940.  The position was largely ceremonial by this time, and Tupper had little influence over the government of John Bracken.  He died in Winnipeg in 1947.

References 

1862 births
1947 deaths
Lawyers in Manitoba
Lawyers in Nova Scotia
Children of prime ministers of Canada
Tupper, William Johnson
Harvard Law School alumni
Lieutenant Governors of Manitoba
Progressive Conservative Party of Manitoba MLAs
Tupper, William Jonhston
People of New England Planter descent
Upper Canada College alumni
Canadian King's Counsel
Younger sons of baronets